Yidinji or Yidindji may refer ro:

 Yidinji people
 Sovereign Yidindji Government
 Yidiny language

Language and nationality disambiguation pages